The 2014 Zandvoort Masters was the 24th edition of the Masters of Formula 3 event, a non-championship race for cars that conform to Formula Three regulations. The event was held on 6 July 2014 at Circuit Park Zandvoort, in Zandvoort, North Holland; it was the 22nd time that the circuit held the event.

Motopark driver Max Verstappen – the son of 1993 winner and former Formula One driver, Jos Verstappen – started from pole position, and led every lap en route to becoming the youngest winner in the race's history, aged 16. Verstappen won by six seconds on the road from Jules Szymkowiak, his Van Amersfoort Racing teammate in the FIA European Formula 3 Championship. However, Szymkowiak was given a 20-second penalty post-race after a first-corner incident with Sam MacLeod, the team's German Formula Three Championship driver, which dropped him to fifth place. This promoted Performance Racing's Steijn Schothorst, on his Formula Three début, into second place, and Motopark's Nabil Jeffri into third place.

Drivers and teams
Eleven drivers from seven countries contested the 2014 Zandvoort Masters; four drivers represented the German Formula Three Championship, with three each from the FIA European Formula 3 Championship and the British Formula 3 Championship. Steijn Schothorst completed the field, competing in his first Formula Three race with Performance Racing, stepping up from the Formula Renault Eurocup.

The Zandvoort Masters was first contested in 1991 as a one-off international meeting with drivers from all the major national Formula Three championships invited to compete. The race was considered a stepping stone to higher racing categories such as Formula One and it returned the Circuit Zandvoort to international recognition after the series stopped holding events at the track at the end of the 1985 season. It later took over from the Monaco Grand Prix Formula Three support race as the most prestigious meeting in European Formula Three. Circuit Zolder hosted the 2007 and 2008 editions due to noise restrictions imposed by the Supreme Court of the Netherlands in the Zandvoort area. The Masters of Formula 3 returned to Zandvoort in 2009 and it continued to hold it until its last iteration in 2016 due to calendar changes for the track and FIA Formula Three European Championship regulations probiting any racing activity prior the round in the same area.

Classification

Qualifying
Two qualifying sessions were held for the event, with the driver's fastest lap from either session, counting towards their respective grid position.

Race

References

Masters of Formula Three
Zandvoort
Zandvoort
Masters of Formula Three